The sixth competition weekend of the 2009–10 ISU Speed Skating World Cup was held in the Gunda Niemann-Stirnemann-Halle, Erfurt, Germany, from Saturday, 6 March, until Sunday, 7 March 2010.

Schedule of events
The schedule of the event is below.

Medal summary

Men's events

Women's events

References

Results

6
Isu World Cup, 2009-10, 6
Sport in Erfurt
2010s in Thuringia